Paul Hamilton (October 16, 1762 – June 30, 1816) was the 3rd United States Secretary of the Navy, from 1809 to 1813.

Paul Hamilton was born in Saint Paul's Parish, South Carolina, on October 16, 1762. He left school at the age of sixteen due to financial problems. During the American War of Independence he served in military roles in the southern states, fighting under General Francis Marion.  He participated with Colonel William Harden in the capture of Fort Balfour.

Following the war, he was a planter and public figure.  Hamilton served South Carolina in many public offices including state Representative (1787), State Senator (1794), Comptroller (1800), and the 42nd Governor (1804).

In 1809, President James Madison selected Hamilton to become the third Secretary of the Navy. His term in office included the first months of the War of 1812, during which time the small United States Navy achieved several remarkable victories over British warships.
Hamilton was a proponent of military preparedness, especially sea fortifications. Although he wanted to strengthen the Navy, he found the Congress hostile and the President indifferent to his ideas. However, he was responsible for the Naval Hospitals Act of 1811.  Secretary Hamilton resigned at the end of 1812 and returned to South Carolina, where he died in Beaufort on June 30, 1816.

Also bearing his name is the town of Hamilton, Georgia.

References

External links
SCIway Biography of Paul Hamilton
NGA Biography of Paul Hamilton
 
Paul Hamilton Papers at the University of South Carolina Library's Digital Collections Page (letters from 1802 to 1812)

1762 births
1816 deaths
Members of the South Carolina House of Representatives
South Carolina state senators
Governors of South Carolina
University of South Carolina trustees
United States Secretaries of the Navy
United States Army personnel of the War of 1812
Farmers from South Carolina
South Carolina militiamen in the American Revolution
American planters
American slave owners
South Carolina Democratic-Republicans
Madison administration cabinet members
Democratic-Republican Party state governors of the United States
18th-century American politicians
19th-century American politicians
Comptrollers General of South Carolina